The Forbes list of Australia's 50 richest people is the annual survey of the fifty wealthiest people resident in Australia, published by Forbes Asia on 15 January 2019. 

The net worth of the wealthiest individual, Gina Rinehart, was estimated to be 14.80 billion; while the net worth of the 50th wealthiest individual, Michael Heine, was estimated to be 750 million.

List of individuals

See also
 Financial Review Rich List
 Forbes list of Australia's 50 richest people

References

2019 in Australia
2019